Bloemenbier is a Belgian beer brewed with flowers.

The beer is brewed by De Proefbrouwerij in a small Belgian town in Lochristi, famous for its flowers.
Bloemenbier is amber with an alcohol content of 7%. Flowers are used in the fermentation process.

See also 
 Beer in Belgium

External links
Brewery website

References
 Alle Belgische bieren – Hilde Deweer – 2011 – 

Belgian beer brands
Lochristi